Wuri District is a district in southern Taichung, Taiwan. Both of the two north–south freeways (National Freeway 1 and National Freeway 3), as well as Provincial Highway 74 pass through Wuri. Wuri is also home to a large military training centre, Chengkungling, as well as Taichung HSR station, which can connect to Taiwan High Speed Rail, Taiwan Railways, and Green line of Taichung Metro.

Administrative divisions 
Wuri, Huri, Sanhe, Rongquan, Xuetian, Jiude, Rende, Qianzhu, Wuguang, Guangming, Tungyuan, Xiju, Luotan, Beili, Nanli and Xiwei Village.

Geography 
 Area: 43.4032 km2
 Population: 78,510 people (February 2023)
Wuri District borders Dadu, Nantun, South, Dali, and Wufeng districts of Taichung City, as well as Changhua City and Fenyuan Township of Changhua County.

Education

Senior high schools 
 Mingdao Senior High School

Junior high schools 
 Wurih Junior High School
 Guangde Junior High School
 Shinan Junior High School
 Mingdao Senior High School Junior High Department

Elementary schools 
 Wurih Elementary School
 Jiude Elementary School
 Qiaoren Elementary School
 Wuguang Elementary School
 Xuguang Elementary School
 Dongyuan Elementary School
 Ka Li Elementary School
 Xiwei Elementary School

Experimental schools 
 Mother Earth Waldorf Experimental School

Public library 
Taichung Public Library Wuri Branch

Native products 
 Beer

Tourist attractions 
 Chengkungling History Museum
 Greater Taichung International Expo Center

Transportation 

 THSR Taichung Station
 TRA Wuri, Xinwuri and Chenggong Stations
 Taichung Metro Jiuzhangli, Jiude, Wuri and HSR Taichung Stations
 Sun Yat-sen Freeway, No.1
 Formosa Freeway, No.3
 Provincial Highway 1
 Provincial Highway 74

See also 
 Taichung

References

External links 

  

Districts of Taichung